Gustav Wilhelm August Josef Ricker (November 2, 1870 – September 23, 1948) was a German physician and pathologist born in Hadamar, Hesse-Nassau.

He studied philosophy and medicine at several universities, earning his doctorate in 1893 at the University of Berlin. In 1897 he received his habilitation under Albert Thierfelder (1842-1908) at the University of Rostock, and from 1906 until 1933 was head of pathology at the city hospitals (Altstadt and Sudenburg) in Magdeburg. Afterwards he worked as a private scholar in Berlin and Dresden.

Ricker is remembered for his Stufengesetz (law of stages), relating the intensity of neural stimulation to blood flow in capillaries, and also Relationspathologie (relational pathology), in which he maintains that the root of pathological processes are a neural process and not a cellular process.

Today in Magdeburg, Gustav-Ricker-Straße and Gustav-Ricker-Krankenhaus are named in his honor.

Selected publications 
 Entwurf einer Relationspathologie, 1905
 Grundlinien einer Logik der Physiologie als reiner Naturwissenschaft, 1912
 Pathologie als Naturwissenschaft – Relationspathologie – Für Pathologen, Physiologen, Mediziner und Biologen, 1924
 Wissenschaftstheoretische Aufsätze für Ärzte, 1936

References 
 Parts of this article are based on a translation of the equivalent article from the German Wikipedia.
 Uni-Magdeburg by Horst Peter Wolff, translated biography

External links
 

1870 births
1948 deaths
People from Limburg-Weilburg
German pathologists
People from Hesse-Nassau